Zelenyi Hai is a village in Lozova Raion, Kharkiv Oblast, Ukraine. It belongs to Lozova urban hromada, one of the hromadas of Ukraine.

References

Villages in Lozova Raion